Yadanabonmyint Monastery, also known as the Queen Seindon Monastery, is a historic Buddhist monastery in Mawlamyine, Mon State, Myanmar. The monastery was constructed under the guidance of Seindon Mibaya, a fourth ranking queen of King Mindon Min and architects from Mandalay. The entire construction was funded by a wealthy lady called Daw Shwe Pwint. The monastery is known for its royal craftsmanship and motifs, and was formally consecrated in 1886 when it was donated to the Rama Sayadaw.

See also
Buddhism in Myanmar

References

Buddhist temples in Myanmar
Buildings and structures in Mon State
Religious buildings and structures completed in 1886
19th-century Buddhist temples
1886 establishments in Burma